Cardites floridana, or the Broad-ribbed Carditid, is a marine clam in the family Carditidae. It can be found along the coasts of Florida, Central America, South America (Brazil, Uruguay) and the Gulf of Mexico.

Description 
The shell shape of C. floridana is elongated quadrangular. The color is whitish gray with small areas of brown arranged on the ribs, covered by gray periostracum. It has approximately 20 coarse, rounded, beaded radial ribs. The interior is white with small light brown patches above muscle scars. It grows to be around 18-38 mm long. It  typically inhabits sea-grass at a depth no more than 35 m (100 ft).

References 

Carditidae